Dávid Géczy (born 6 June 1981) is a Hungarian Chicago Silver Hugo prize, Cannes Silver Dolphin and Berlin Red Dot winner film director and screenwriter.

Life
Géczy Dávid was born and raised in Budapest, Hungary. His interest in movies began when he was young. He worked in video stores, cinemas and for Film Magazines.

He graduated from Pázmány Péter Catholic University, Faculty of Humanities and Social Sciences, where he studied Aesthetics and Communication Studies (Film, TV specialization) in 2006.

His father, Géczy Bálint is a film and TV producer, PR expert, Deputy Head of Directorate-General of the Hungarian Press and Communication. His grandfather Géczy József was a writer and poet.

Career
After graduating from university, he directed TV shows, advertisements and commercials for the internet and around 60 television channels. In 2007 his first short movie, Hangár was shot. He was the co-director of the play Hamlet-illúziók (Hamlet-illusions) which was a unique combination of theater and movie tools.

He has directed national and international videoclips and also an authentically reconstructed documentary: Csepeli kettős gyilkosság (Double murder in Csepel), based on a crime in 2009 (similar to the investigative documentaries produced by BBC Crime).

Since 2013 he has been involved in more image spots of Liszt Academy of Music. The first image clip of Academy, called Lisztérium - Ahol él a zene (Lisztery - where the music lives), was directed by Dávid in 2015. This clip was presented by Mezzo TV and BBC and won the following Awards in that year:

Silver Hugo Award in 51st Chicago International Film Festival, Red Dot Award in 60th Red Dot Design Award, 12. Golden Eye Cinematographer Festival's Award in Advertisement Category, organised by Hungarian Society of Cinematographers.

This short movie has also contributed Liszt Academy of Music to receive Design Management Award of Hungarian Design Council.

In 2012 his third short movie, Vér és tűsarok (Blood and High Heels) was part of the Short Film Corner Programme at the Cannes Film Festival.

He had got government financial support for shooting A győztes (The winner) short movie in 2013. The movie was selected in Odense International Film Festival Programme in 2015 and also was selected in BestOFF15 selection of the Festival organiser Danish Film Institute, among the best 11 movies. The film was one of the four Hungarian films that were selected into the Special Screening section as the focus of the 12th Akbank Short Film Festival (2016) in Turkey. Géczy Dávid were invited to take part in the roundtable-discussion called Experiences as well as Elma Tataragic (curator of Sarajevo Film Festival), Carter Pilcher (CEO and funder of ShortsTV International) and Gábor Hörcher (Hungarian director).

His first full-length feature Game Over Club, a black comedy movie was supposed to debut in Autumn 2019.

Filmography

Television

Advertising Films

Awards and honors
2022 Don't Be Afraid/Sose félj! - Kosice International Film Festival 2022/2023 Autumn Edition - Best Music Video
2021 Genocide in Pozsonyligetfalu - 1st Monthly Film Festival - Best medium documentary length film, Gemini Edition June 2021
2021 Genocide in Pozsonyligetfalu - Hungarian Motion Picture Festival - Hungarian Motion Picture Award best documentary short
2021 Ma is meghaltam százszor Kaszkadőrök (I died today too a hundred times Stuntmen's) - Hungarian Motion Picture Festival - nominee of the best documentary feature by the Hungarian Motion Picture Award
2020 Genocide in Pozsonyligetfalu - EduFilm Fest December 2020 - best documentary
2019 Festival Academy Budapest image film - International Academy of Digital Arts and Sciences (IADAS), London, Lovie Award bronze
2018 True Musicians - Indie Fest international film festival in California, Awards of Merit
2018 True Musicians - Los Angeles Film Awards September, Best TV Series
2018 Hunting Partners - IV. International Nature Film Festival Gödöllő - SZIE Special Prize
2017 Bartók World Competition & Festival - image spot - 62nd Red Dot Design Award „Red Dot”
2017 Bartók World Competition & Festival - image spot - 8th Cannes Corporate Media & TV Awards: Silver Dolphin
2017 Bartók World Competition & Festival - image spot - 53rd Chicago International Film Festival: Silver Hugo
2015 A csepeli kettős gyilkosság - 4th Proofreading Media Conference, Camera Award, portrait-document category shared third place
2015 Liszt Ferenc Academy of Music Lisztery; Music Here Lives" image film - 60th Red Dot Design Award „Red Dot”
2015 The Winner - Odense International Film Festival Best OFF15 selection
2015 Liszt Ferenc Academy of Music Lisztery; Music Here Lives" image film - 51. Chicago International Film Festival: Silver Hugo
2008 Hangár - 15. National Student Film Festival: Special Prize
2008 Hangár - Tallinn The 6th International Festival of Non-professional Film Makers: Special Prize
2007 Hangár - Pécs "Szemlétek" Audi Vision's Film and Arts Meeting: audience Award
2005 „Szekszárdi Örökség” - Szekszárd II. Digi24 Short Film Festival: 2nd place
2003 „Falu Skizo” - Faludi Ferenc Academy: Best Short Film
2002 „Részegségek és tobzódások” - Faludi Ferenc Academy: Best Short Film

References
Hübners Who is who Magyarországon Géczy Dávid 

Berlinale 2015 Hungarian Film Magazine (pp. 70) The first issue of the Hungarian Film Magazine, published by the Hungarian National Film Fund - February 2015

External links
 Dávid Géczy official YouTube channel
 DaveFilm YouTube channel

1981 births
Living people
Hungarian film directors